Hermann Eberhard (27 February 1852 in Ohlau, Silesia – 30 May 1908) was a 19th-century German explorer credited with western discovery of considerable lands in Patagonia, Chile.  Eberhard journeyed by boat up the Seno Última Esperanza to investigate lands previously unknown to Europeans. Eberhard is credited with the discovery of prehistoric remains of the Giant sloth at the Cueva del Milodon Natural Monument. The waters of the Seno Última Esperanza would have been much higher and thus closer to the Milodon caves in the early Holocene, the epoch to which the milodon bones are dated.

See also
Eberhard Fjord

References
C. Michael Hogan, Cueva del Milodon, Megalithic Portal, 13 April 2008 
The discovery of the region of Última Esperanza  retrieved Aug. 2008

Line notes

19th-century explorers
German explorers
1852 births
1908 deaths
People from Oława
People from the Province of Silesia
 Explorers of Chile